Newport Harbor High School is a public high school in Newport Beach, in Orange County, California, in the United States. It is part of the Newport-Mesa Unified School District. The school primarily serves students in western Newport Beach and southern Costa Mesa.

Demographics

Roughly 2260 students enroll across grades 9-12 (2021). 59% of students are White, 35% Hispanic, and 6% other.  82 full-time faculty teach across 9 departments.

History
Roughly two months after the Wall Street Crash of 1929, on December 29, 1929, the Irvine Company offered  of land to the school district located at 15th and Irvine for $15,000.

Ground breaking for the first high school in Newport Beach began June 14, 1930, at an original construction cost of $410,000. The original school comprised a main building, the main gym, the tower, a wood shop, the bus garage, and a caretaker's cottage. The total enrollment that first year was just 178 students, taught by 12 faculty members. There were no seniors, as they had chosen to remain at their original schools to graduate with their alma maters’ class.

By 1948, the school had its first gym, metal shop, and snack bar. Eight army barracks were installed to be used as classrooms. When the big football stadium was finally built, it was named Davidson Field in honor of Sidney Davidson, the school's first principal. He had the altruistic distinction of working for the first seven months without pay.

In 2005, a $282 million school bond issue Measure F was approved by local ballot. Passage of Measure F allows for certain improvements to local schools and libraries in the district.

Newport Harbor High School received funding from Measure F that included demolition of the  Robins-Loats building, its replacement by an all new  steel-framed building, and rebuilding the landmark  bell tower. The "Robins-Loats Reconstruction" costs are estimated at $45 million. The original Robins Hall Tower stood for 77 years. The tower was demolished in August 2007 because of earthquake code requirements.

Academics
Newport Harbor High School (NHHS) has been designated a California Distinguished School, International Baccalaureate World School, and National Blue Ribbon School. Based on the Accountability Progress Report, Newport Harbor is ranked 8 out of 10 in the state.

Newport Harbor offers a variety of AP courses for the students. These courses include: Art History, Studio Art: 2-D Design, Biology, Calculus, Chemistry, comparative Government and Politics, Computer Science, English Language and Composition, English Literature and Composition, Environmental Science, European History, U.S. Government and Politics, Physics, Psychology, Spanish Language and Culture, World History, and US History.

NHHS began offering the International Baccalaureate Diploma Program in 2010. Successful completion of AP and IB courses is usually rewarded with course credit or used for placement.

In addition to accelerated coursework, NHHS also offers the Career Technical Education (CTE) Pathway: a multiyear sequence of courses that integrates core academic knowledge with technical and occupational knowledge to provide students with a pathway to post-secondary education and careers. CTE has three pathways: (1) Digital Media Arts, (2) Business, and (3) Culinary.

Athletics

Newport Harbor High School has water polo, lacrosse, volleyball, tennis, baseball, football, basketball, cross country, field hockey, sailing, soccer, softball, surf, track and field and wrestling teams. Its teams compete in the Sunset League of the California Interscholastic Federation's Southern Section. NHHS teams are known as the Sailors, though fans also refer to them as the "Tars". The school colors are primarily blue and gray, and the mascot is Tommy Tar, a representation of Popeye the Sailor Man. Each year the Sailors football team plays in "The Battle of The Bay" against their cross-town rival, Corona Del Mar High School.

Activities
Newport Harbor offers co-curricular activities for course credit, including: band/jazz band, cheer squad, choir, dance, drama, newspaper, surf team, yearbook and ASB.

Art at Newport Harbor
Newport Harbor has made a significant commitment to the arts.  Beginning in 1935, Principal Sidney Davidson urged senior classes to purchase paintings from local artists as their gift to the school. The class of 1935 purchased Snow Scene by Thomas Hunt.  In 1937, through the Depression Era Federal Art Project, the school commissioned two mosaics: The Boys by Arthur Ames and The Girls by Jean Goodwin. Over the course of several decades, the school acquired a collection of art through hosting the annual Newport Beach Art Exhibition, showcasing notable Southern California artists.  Each year, an oil and watercolor winner were purchased.  By 1946, The Newport Beach Chamber of Commerce agreed to sponsor the shows with $300 in purchase prize money.   Different critics judged the event each year, allowing the collection to "pull together a collection that would have the major Edgar Payne (work) from the 1920s, the Bob Irwin abstract Expressionist canvas from the late 1950s, the fine Frederick Hammersley abstract classicist work in 1963 and the Edie Danieli from the Op era".  The librarian responsible for procuring the collection, Ruth Stoever Fleming, serves as namesake for the art collection.  The legacy of the art earned the school an ALA John Cotton Dana Award.

Notable alumni

Geoff Abrams, tennis player
Alex Crawford, actor
Terry Albritton, shot putter
Steve Aoki, Electro House musician
Hope Bender, Track and Field athlete
Amy Biehl, anti-apartheid activist
Charlie Buckingham, Olympian, sailing
Dave Cadigan, NFL football player
Ethan Cochran, discus thrower
Charlie Colin, musician (Train), Grammy winning songwriter
Richie Collins (surfer), professional surfer
Douglas Crockford, programmer
Luca Cupido, Olympian, water polo

Kaleigh Gilchrist, Olympian, Water Polo
Dana Sue Gray, serial killer
Peter Jason, actor
Greg Laurie, pastor and evangelist
Paul Le Mat, actor
Esther Lofgren, Olympic gold medalist, rowing
Gray Lyda, comic book artist and writer
Greg MacGillivray, filmmaker
Misty May, professional beach volleyball player, Olympic gold medalist
Kelly McGillis, actress
Ted McGinley, actor
David McKenna (writer)
Lee Mallory, poet, editor, retired professor
Frank Marshall, filmmaker
Marguerite Moreau, actress
Jim Neidhart, wrestler, held shot put record from 1973 to 1985
Aaron Peirsol, 7× Olympic medalist, swimming
Bruce Penhall, racer, actor
Kasey Peters, American football player
Gary Riley, actor
April Ross, AVP beach volleyball player, Olympic medalist
Sharon Sheeley, songwriter
Allison Stokke, pole vaulter
Steve Timmons, 2× Olympic gold medalist, volleyball
Bill Voss, former Major League Baseball player
Tyson Wahl, Major League Soccer player
Ethan Wayne, actor
Robert "Wingnut" Weaver, surfer
Zach Wells, Major League soccer player
Irene Worth, actress
George Yardley, NBA Hall of Fame
Anthony Zerbe, actor
Constance Zimmer, actress

References

External links

NHHS Official website
 IRE Journal Sept/Oct 2000 "Exposing The Pentagon's Secret BioWar"
 IRE, Investigative Reporters and Editors, Reference Library
 
 
 
 

Educational institutions established in 1930
High schools in Orange County, California
Public high schools in California
1930 establishments in California
International Baccalaureate schools in California